Ukrainian Village is a Chicago neighborhood located on the near west side of Chicago.  Its boundaries are Division Street to the north, Grand Avenue to the south, Western Avenue to the west (although some maps extend to Campbell Street to the west), and Damen Avenue to the east. It is one of the neighborhoods in the West Town community area, and has one of the largest concentrations of Ukrainians in the United States.

History
Ukrainian Village, like neighboring East Village, began as farmland. Originally, German Americans, who came mostly as immigrants in the mid-19th century, formed the largest ethnic group in the vicinity. With new waves of immigration starting in the late 19th century, by the turn of the century, the neighborhood was largely Slavic. Similar to Chicago's Lithuanian Downtown in Bridgeport, Ukrainians settled in the district because of their familiarity with Poles who lived in the surrounding Polish Downtown. Dense settlement of the neighborhood was largely spurred by the 1895 construction of an elevated train line along Paulina Ave (1700 W), which provided access to workplaces. It was decommissioned in 1964.

The Ukrainian community in the Chicago metropolitan area is not localized, but there was a concentration of immigrants and their descendants in what is now known as Ukrainian Village. This central area has been the focus of Ukrainian life since around the start of the 20th century. It continues to function as its hub, as it has three major Ukrainian churches, Ukrainian-owned financial institutions, a Ukrainian-language grammar school, the Ukrainian National Museum, a Ukrainian Cultural Center, the Ukrainian Institute of Modern Art, two Ukrainian youth organizations, and many Ukrainian-owned restaurants, stores and businesses.

Over the past half century, Ukrainian Village has remained a middle-class neighborhood, populated largely by older citizens of Eastern European ethnicity. It is bordered (and affected) on many sides by areas suffering more poverty and crime. It was insulated somewhat from surrounding socioeconomic change in the large industrial areas on its south and west borders by the strong fabric of ethnic institutions as well as the staying power of the Orthodox and Ukrainian Catholic congregations. As noted above, there are also significant ethnic cultural institutions in the area. Although Ukrainian Village continues to be the center of Chicago's large Ukrainian community, the gentrification of West Town, Chicago community area is rapidly changing the demographic. Ukrainian Village continues to be home to approximately 15,000 ethnic Ukrainians.

Other notable local landmarks include Ss. Volodymyr and Olha Ukrainian Catholic Church, St. Nicholas Ukrainian Catholic Cathedral, St. Volodymyr Ukrainian Orthodox Cathedral, Roberto Clemente High School, St Mary's Hospital, and Holy Trinity Russian Orthodox Cathedral. The latter was commissioned by St. John Kochurov and designed by famed architect Louis Sullivan.

Churches
There are several churches within Ukrainian Village, with three located on one street, and most being within a block of each other. St. Nicholas Ukrainian Catholic Cathedral was the first of the two Ukrainian Greek Catholic churches in the village. Ss. Volodymyr and Olha Ukrainian Catholic Church formed in the 1970s after St. Nicholas' parish split in disagreement. St. Volodymyr Ukrainian Orthodox Cathedral represents the Eastern European Ukrainian Orthodox Church and primarily serves the fourth wave of Ukrainian immigrants from the 1990s. Holy Trinity Russian Orthodox Cathedral was the first Eastern European Russian Orthodox church to be built in what was then called the "Slavic Village." It was commissioned by St. John Kochurov and designed by famed architect Louis Sullivan.

St. Nicholas Ukrainian Catholic Cathedral

Chicago's Ukrainian history begins on the north side with the arrival of immigrants from western and Carpathian Ukraine in the late 1890s. At the time, they called themselves Rusyns (Ruthenians), an anachronistic national appellation associated with Ukraine's role within the Austro-Hungarian empire.

St. Nicholas was the home of the famed Lysenko Chorus, which won first place in a 1930 multi-state choral contest sponsored by the Chicago Tribune.

Sts. Volodymyr and Olha Ukrainian Catholic Parish in Chicago

Sts. Volodymyr and Olha Ukrainian Catholic Parish in Chicago was founded in 1968 by Patriarch Josyf Slipyj and the bishop of the Eparchy of Chicago, Yaroslav Gabro. They and congregation members wanted to preserve and nurture the traditions of the Ukrainian Church. This church adheres to the Julian Calendar, a traditional liturgy, and a unique spiritual heritage.

St. Volodymyr Ukrainian Orthodox Cathedral

St. Volodymyr Ukrainian Orthodox Cathedral represents Eastern Orthodox Christianity, the dominant religion in Ukraine. It has served new immigrants who have left Ukraine since the fall of the Soviet Union. Although Orthodox in faith, the cathedral is under the UOCUSA, which is under the jurisdiction of the Ecumenical Patriarchate and has no affiliation with the Ukrainian Orthodox Church in Ukraine.

The church was originally built for a German parish. It was sold twice before it was finally bought and converted by the current Ukrainian parish. The parish runs a Saturday school of Ukrainian language for students from preschool to 10th grade.

Ukrainian Village District
On December 4, 2002, the Ukrainian Village District, centering on Haddon Avenue, Thomas Street, and Cortez Street between Damen and Leavitt Avenues, including portions of Damen, Hoyne and Leavitt Avenues, was designated as a Chicago Landmark District. Extensions to the district were designated in 2005 and on April 11, 2007.

Gallery

See also
 Slavic Village in Cleveland, Ohio

References

External links

 'Ukrainian Chicago' blog on Chicago Tribune's site ChicagoNow.com
 Official City of Chicago West Town Community Map
ForgottenChicago.com's article on Ornamental Stained Glass in Ukrainian Village
 Ukrainian Village Neighborhood Association
 Ukrainian Village Neighborhood Watch
 Ukrainian Diaspora in Canada and U.S.

Ethnic enclaves in Illinois
Chicago Landmarks
Neighborhoods in Chicago
Ukrainian-American culture in Chicago
Ukrainian communities in the United States
Rusyn-American culture in Illinois